PK-110 (Upper South Waziristan) is a constituency for the Khyber Pakhtunkhwa Assembly of the Khyber Pakhtunkhwa province of Pakistan.

Members of Assembly

2019-2023: PK-113 South Waziristan-I

Election 2019 
After merger of FATA with Khyber Pakhtunkhwa provincial elections were held for the very first time. JUI-F Candidate Isam-ud-Din won the seat by getting 9712 votes.

See also 

 PK-109 Lower South Waziristan
 PK-111 Dera Ismail Khan-I

References

External links 

 Khyber Pakhtunkhwa Assembly's official website
 Election Commission of Pakistan's official website
 Awaztoday.com Search Result
 Election Commission Pakistan Search Result

Khyber Pakhtunkhwa Assembly constituencies